Totleben may refer to:

 Count Gottlieb (Curt) Heinrich Totleben, Lord at Tottleben, Zeippau and Hausdorf im Saganschen (1715, Tottleben – 1773), Saxony-born Russian general
 Count Eduard Totleben (1818, Jelgava – 1884), Russian general
 John Totleben (born 1958, Erie, Pennsylvania), American illustrator

See also 
 Totleben, a village in Pleven Province, Bulgaria, named after Eduard Totleben

German-language surnames
Toponymic surnames
Thuringian nobility
Saxon nobility
Silesian nobility
German noble families
Russian nobility

de:Tottleben (Begriffsklärung)